Domah or Doma is a mandal in Vikarabad district of Telangana, India.

Geography
It has an average elevation of 558 meters (1833 feet).

Villages
Doma consists of 49 Villages and 21 Panchayats. Ananthareddipalle is the smallest village and Mothkur is the biggest village. It is in the 547 m elevation. It is on the border of the Rangareddi District and Mahbubnagar District. Mahbubnagar District Bomraspeta is west towards this place.

Panchayats
Ainapur Bachpally, Badampally, Bompally, Brahmanpally, Budlapur, Dadapur, Dirsampally, Doma, Sanjeev nagar, Dornalpally, Gudur, Gumdal, Kistapur, Mailaram, Mallepally, Mothukur, Ootpally, Palepally, Rakonda Sivareddypally.

References

Mandals in Vikarabad district